Violent Waves is the fourth studio album by the American rock band Circa Survive. It was released on August 28, 2012. As Circa Survive wanted a record that would capture the band's live sound, where they felt the magic of the band lay, they recorded the album in one week and produced it themselves. Violent Waves is also Circa Survive's first and only album released without a record label.

The album debuted at #3 on the Top Modern Rock/Alternative Albums and #15 on the Billboard Top 200 without any label or distribution support.

Recording started on April 16, 2012 and was completed on April 24, 2012 at Studio 4 in Conshohocken, PA. Additional production by Will Yip & Vince Ratti. Engineered by Will Yip & Vince Ratti. Mixed by Vince Ratti with assistance from Will Yip.

As with Circa Survive's previous albums, Esao Andrews created the album artwork.

Track listing

References

Circa Survive albums
2012 albums
Self-released albums
Albums produced by Will Yip